, known by her birth name  is a Japanese television presenter and former singer and actress.

She debuted in August 2001 with the girl group Morning Musume and participated in musical projects within Hello! Project. After leaving the group on March 31, 2011, she became a television presenter for TV Tokyo. Her husband is Japanese baseball player Toshihiro Sugiura.

Biography
Konno joined the group Morning Musume in 2001. She passed the audition in  although it has been called mediocre by the judge of the audition.

She debuted on the group's thirteenth single, "Mr. Moonlight (Ai no Big Band)," released on October 31, 2001. Her first album appearance was the fourth album 4th Ikimasshoi!, released on March 27, 2002.

In May of the same year, Konno was unexpectedly given the lead role for the second half of Morning Musume's annual play, Morning Town. In the summer of that year, she also debuted in a shuffle unit, as part of Odoru 11. She was separated from all the other fifth generation members, who were in Happy 7.

Later in September, all the fifth generation members were placed into a subgroup. Along with fellow member  Risa Niigaki and Melon Kinenbi's Ayumi Shibata Konno was put into Tanpopo as the third generation. They only released one single.

Konno starred in a drama entitled Angel Hearts which was released in 2002.

2003, she was placed into Sakuragumi. Konno became one of its founding members, and remained with the unit until her graduation.

In July of the same year, she was added into Japanese idol pop band Country Musume with Miki Fujimoto. Under this new formation, named "Country Musume ni Konno to Fujimoto", three singles were released. She also made a guest appearance in a drama, Kochira Hon Ikegami Sho 2 that year, as a hit-and-run victim's sister.

In late 2004, Tsunku's chose to give Konno the main vocals for "Namida ga Tomaranai Hōkago".

In March 2006, she proved her athletic abilities by placing first in the 1500 meter race at Hello! Project's 2006 sports festival in the time of six minutes and thirteen seconds, getting her the MVP award. On July 23, 2006, Konno graduated from Morning Musume and Hello! Project to continue her studies at a university. The last single and album she participated in were "Ambitious! Yashinteki de Ii Jan" and Rainbow 7.

The news of Konno's acceptance to Keio University was announced on December 11, 2006. On December 28, 2006, she confirmed these claims personally, in a message posted on the main Hello! Project website.

Although she was officially no longer part of Hello! Project at the time, on January 28, 2007, she appeared on stage at Hello! Project's 10th anniversary concert.

On June 18, 2007, Up-Front Agency confirmed that Konno was returning to Hello! Project to rejoin members of Gatas Brilhantes H.P. in the Japanese pop idol group Ongaku Gatas. Their first single "Narihajimeta Koi no Bell" was released on August 22, 2007. It was stated that Konno would remain an active member within the agency and Ongaku Gatas while continuing her university studies.

She performed at the Hello Pro Award '09 Elder Club Sotsugyo Kinen Special concert on February 1, 2009.

In early 2009, Konno graduated from Hello! Project with the rest of the Elder Club, though continued as a member of her band Ongaku Gatas, and continuing to tour with them. It was announced via the Hello! Project official site on October 1, 2010, that she would debut as a reporter for TV Tokyo in April 2011.

It was announced on Tokyo Hive that she and her co-host would be releasing a single titled "Jyunjyou Fighter".

Konno and fellow former 5th generation member Makoto Ogawa made a special appearance at Morning Musume's Autumn Tour the day before Ai Takahashi's graduation.

She is married to professional baseball player Sugiura Toshihiro and they have three children.

Appearances

Filmography

DVDs

Dramas 
 2002 – Angel Hearts
 2002 – 
 2003 –  (Guest)
 2004 – 
 2005 –

Movies 
 2002 – 
 2003 –

Photobooks 

Source:

Radio

TV shows

Internet

References

External links 
 
 Konno Asami blog @ TV Tokyo

11Water members
1987 births
Country Musume members
Japanese television personalities
Living people
Morning Musume members
Tanpopo members
Musicians from Sapporo
Keio University alumni